Gustav Jarl (born 28 May 1995) is a Swedish footballer who plays as a defender.

References

External links

1995 births
Living people
Association football defenders
Helsingborgs IF players
Assyriska FF players
AFC Eskilstuna players
Allsvenskan players
Superettan players
Swedish footballers